USS Pochard (AM-375) was an  acquired by the United States Navy for the dangerous task of removing mines from minefields laid in the water to prevent ships from passing.

Pochard was named after the pochard, a heavy-bodied diving duck.

Pochard was laid down by Savannah Machine and Foundry Co., Savannah, Georgia, 10 February 1944; launched 11 June 1944; sponsored by Mrs. Mary E. Kennard; and commissioned 27 November 1944.

World War II Pacific operations 
After fitting out and shakedown, she departed Norfolk, Virginia, for the Panama Canal Zone on 19 February 1945 escorting . She then proceeded to San Francisco, California, and San Diego, California, and sailed for Pearl Harbor; Eniwetok, Marshall Islands; and Guam; arriving Okinawa on 28 June. During July and August she conducted minesweeping operations around Kerama Retto.

On 22 August Pochard was assigned to Commander 3rd Fleet, and proceeded to Tokyo Bay, arriving on the 29th. She remained in Tokyo Bay only a short period before sailing for Okinoyama Shoals, Sagami Wan, to conduct mine sweeping operations.

Pochard remained in the Far East conducting minesweeping operations until 26 March 1946. She then returned to the United States for inactivation, decommissioning 15 January 1947.

Second commissioning 
Pochard was berthed at San Diego, California, as a unit of the Pacific Reserve Fleet until recommissioned 27 February 1952. On 19 May she reported for duty with the Atlantic Fleet, at Charleston, South Carolina, whence she operated alternating U.S. East Coast and Caribbean cruises with Mediterranean deployments until 1955.

Final decommissioning 
Reclassified MSF-375, 7 February 1955, she was placed in reserve in June and decommissioned on 3 August. Assigned to the Florida Group, Atlantic Reserve Fleet, she was berthed at Green Cove Springs, Florida until struck from the Navy List 1 December 1966 and sold for scrap.

Awards 
Pochard received three battle stars for World War II service.

References

External links 
 
 uboat.net - Minesweeper USS Pochard of the Auk class
 Allied Ships Present in Tokyo Bay During the Surrender Ceremony, 2 September 1945
 USS Pochard (AM-375)

 

Auk-class minesweepers of the United States Navy
Ships built in Savannah, Georgia
1944 ships
World War II minesweepers of the United States